Papagayos is a village in Chacabuco Department, San Luis Province, Argentina. Among the small towns that are at the feet of the Comechingones Mountains, Papagayos stands out by its particular landscape of caranday palms.

It borders Villa Larca to the north, Tilisarao to the west, Villa del Carmen to the south and to the east, Córdoba Province.

It has around 750 inhabitants. Its climate is mainly dry with a little summer precipitation.

Toponymy 
There are two theories about Papagayos' name. Some people affirm that it derives from papa-gallo, the name the natives gave to a wild medicinal plant. Another theory says that it may be a confusion of the colonists, calling the burrowing parakeet (Cyanoliseus patagonus) that they found in the zone by that name.

External links 
 
 Satellite view from Google Maps

Gallery

Populated places in San Luis Province